is a railway station in the city of Motosu, Gifu Prefecture, Japan, operated by the private railway operator Tarumi Railway.

Lines

Station layout
Motosu Station has one ground-level island platform connected to the station building by a level crossing. The station is attended. The station also as a rail yard for the Tarumi Railway.

Adjacent stations

|-
!colspan=5|Tarumi Railway

History
It was renamed to its present name of October 6, 1984.

Surrounding area

See also
 List of Railway Stations in Japan

References

External links

 

Railway stations in Gifu Prefecture
Railway stations in Japan opened in 1956
Stations of Tarumi Railway
Motosu, Gifu